The Salem Baptist Church is a Baptist megachurch located at 752 E 114th Street in the Pullman neighborhood of Chicago, Illinois. 
The senior pastor is Charlie Dates.

History
In 1985, James Meeks, pastor of Beth Eden Baptist Church in Chicago, shared the vision of founding a new church in a sermon. After a meeting with 205 members that same day, the church was founded.

The new congregation held its first services January 20, 1985 at 8201 South Jeffrey Boulevard and remained at this location for five-years.

In 2004, it had 17,000 members. 

On January 8, 2023, after 38 years of service Pastor Meeks retired, Charlie Dates succeeded him as senior pastor.

House of Hope

In 2005, the congregation inaugurated the House of Hope, a 10,000-seat facility.  The venue has  of usable space.

See also
List of the largest churches in the USA
List of the largest evangelical churches
List of the largest evangelical church auditoriums
Worship service (evangelicalism)

References

External links
Official website

Churches in Chicago
Baptist churches in Illinois
Evangelical megachurches in the United States
Christian organizations established in 1985
Sports venues in Chicago
Music venues in Chicago
Churches completed in 2005
21st-century Baptist churches in the United States
1985 establishments in Illinois
Megachurches in Illinois